is a California-based Japanese photographer. His books include I See Angels Every Day and Findings.

Life and work
Born in Sapporo, Hokkaido, Japan, in 1951, Watanabe graduated from the Department of Photography of Nihon University in 1975 and moved to Los Angeles where he worked as a production coordinator for Japanese television commercials and later co-founded a Japanese coordination services company. He obtained an MBA from UCLA in 1993, but two years later his earlier interest in photography revived; from 2000 he has worked full-time at photography.

After five self-published books, Watanabe's first to be published conventionally was I See Angels Every Day, monochrome portraits of the patients and other scenes within San Lázaro psychiatric hospital in Quito, Ecuador. This won the 2007 Photo City Sagamihara award for Japanese professional photographers.

In 2005, a portfolio of his work was featured in Nueva Luz photographic journal, volume 10#3. In 2007 Watanabe won a "Critical Mass" award from Photolucida that allowed publication of his monograph Findings.

In 2008, his work of North Korea won Santa Fe Center Project Competition First Prize, and the book titled "Ideology of Paradise" was published in Japan.

He was invited and participated in commission projects such as "Real Venice" in 2010 (its exhibition was a program in 2011 Venice Biennale), "Bull City Summer" in 2013, and "The Art of Survival, Enduring Turmoil of Tule Lake" in 2014.

Watanabe's works are in the permanent collections of the Houston Museum of Fine Arts, George Eastman House, and Santa Barbara Museum of Art.

Publications

Veiled Observations and Reflections. Hiroshi Watanabe (self-published), West Hollywood, Calif.: 2002.
Faces. West Hollywood, Calif.: Hiroshi Watanabe, 2002–2005.
1. San Lazaro Psychiatric Hospital. 2003.
2. Kabuki Players. 2003.
3. Ena Bunraku. 2005.
4. Noh Masks of Naito Clan. 2005.
Watakushi wa mainichi, tenshi o mite iru / I See Angels Every Day. Mado-sha, Tokyo, Japan: 2007. 
Findings. Photolucida, Portland, OR: 2007. .
Paradaisu ideorogī / Ideology in Paradise. Mado-sha, Tokyo, Japan: 2008. 
Suo Sarumawashi. Photo-Eye, Santa Fe, N.M., 2009. .
Love Point. Toseisha, Tokyo, Japan: 2010. 
Love Point. One Picture Book #66, Nazraeli Press, Portland, OR: 2010. .
The Day the Dam Collapses. Daylight Books, Hillsborough, NC & Tosei-sha Publishing Co., Ltd, Tokyo, Japan: 2014. 
Kwaidan, Stories and Studies of Strange Things, photographs by Hiroshi Watanabe, Unicorn Publishing Group, LLP, London, UK: 2019

Notes

External links
Watanabe's site
 Hiroshi Watanabe on En Foco
Records, Shawn. "Hiroshi Watanabe's Findings". 40 Watt. A review of Findings, generously illustrated with photographs.
Watanabe preserves life in portraits, observations, Fotophile.com review of Watanabe's exhibition in Austin, Texas.
Hiroshi Watanabe's exhibition: "Comedy of Duble Meaning" at Takeda Art Co [www.takeda-bijyutu.com]
With My Own Eyes, 180 magazine 08/2005 
Depicting ideology's weight, D.K. Row, The Oregonian, 01/2008 
Imagenesde la psiquiatria, 178. Veo ángeles todos los días. 2011 
Financial Times, That sinking feeling FT.com, By Jan Dalley, 07/2011 
Hiroshi Watanabe, Two Ways Lens, blog by Michael Werner 05/2010 
Lenscratch, Hiroshi Watanabe and The Venice in Peril Project by Aline SmithsonJuly 17, 2011 
The Japan Times, Photographer finds dignity in a dark time, by Ayako Mie, 08/2012, 
PhotoBook Journal, book review by Douglas Stockdale, The Day the Dam Collapses, November, 2014

Japanese photographers
Photography in Korea
American portrait photographers
Japanese emigrants to the United States
Living people
People from Sapporo
Nihon University alumni
Year of birth missing (living people)